Chatham-Kent Secondary School is located in Chatham-Kent, Ontario, Canada. With a student population of about 1200, it is the largest public secondary school in Chatham-Kent operating at 85% capacity. The school is currently undergoing multi-million dollar renovations. The student population is projected to increase with further school consolidations, and the potential closure of John McGregor Secondary School.

Sports

Volleyball
The CKSS Golden Hawks have won 15 OFSAA volleyball titles, ten by boys teams and five by the girls - more provincial titles than any other high school in the province's history
In 2015, the 1989-1990 boys team was enshrined in the Chatham Sports Hall of Fame.

Hockey
In March, 2020, the boys hockey team won the AAA SWOSSAA Championship, by visiting and defeating defending champs Villanova in Windsor, Ontario.

Track and field
Runner Emma Pegg has won a number of awards and set records both during and after her time at CKSS - ranking in the top 250 in the world in the 800m, and the top 750 in the 1500m. As a member of the Golden Hawks team, Pegg was the runner-up for the 2018 Chatham-Kent Female Athlete of the Year award, which she won in 2019.

In 2019 she was also selected as a member of Team Canada.

In 2021, CKSS Golden Hawks Logan Smith and Emma Pegg were co-winners of the Dr. Jack Parry Award.

Arts
CKSS has won numerous awards and accolades in the annual Sears Drama Festival.

Student publications
The school newspaper is The CKSS Gazette (previously published occasionally as The CK Gazette).

Notable alumni
Alumni of CKSS include:
 Jessica Allossery, singer, musician and songwriter.
 Sophie Marvell, author of The Girl Under Water and The Lonely Limpet.
 Emma Pegg, track and field athlete.
 Brooklyn Roebuck, singer who won YTV's The Next Star at age 14 in 2012.
 Ron Sparks, comedian and writer.

50th Anniversary
Over Victoria Day weekend in 2013, the school and the city of Chatham hosted multiple events in celebration of the school's 50th anniversary, culminating in an anniversary show featuring many of the school's prominent graduates and produced by former teacher Bruce Nelson, as well as a dance.

See also
List of high schools in Ontario

References

External links
 Chatham-Kent Secondary School

High schools in Chatham-Kent
Educational institutions established in 1962
1962 establishments in Ontario